Crotalus concolor, commonly known as the midget faded rattlesnake, faded rattlesnake and yellow rattlesnake, is a pit viper species found in the western United States. It is a small rattlesnake known for its faded color pattern. Like all other pit vipers, it is venomous.

Description

The color pattern of this species consists of a pinkish, pale brown, yellow-brown, straw-colored, reddish, or yellow-brown ground color, overlaid with a series of brown elliptical or rectangular dorsal blotches. However, most specimens are gray or silvery. In juveniles, the pattern is distinct, but becomes faded in adults, almost to the point where it is indistinguishable from the ground color.

Geographic range
Found in the United States in the Colorado and Green River basins. This area covers southwestern Wyoming, Utah east of long. 111° West (excluding the southeastern corner) and extreme west-central Colorado. The type locality given is "King's Ranch, Garfield Co., at the base of the Henry Mts [Utah]."

Venom
This species possesses the most toxic venom of the C. oreganus / C. viridis group, although apparently considerable variability exists among local populations. It is even one of the most potent venoms found in North America, and according to  studies, the venom is many times more potent than that of an Asiatic cobra.  It is characterized by the presence of a presynaptic neurotoxin, referred to as concolor toxin, the amount of which varies in individual snakes.

References

Further reading
 Hubbs, Brian, and Brendan O'Connor. 2012. A Guide to the Rattlesnakes and other Venomous Serpents of the United States. Tricolor Books. Tempe, Arizona. 129 pp. . (Crotalus oreganus concolor, pp. 32–33.)
 Woodbury, Angus M. 1929. A new rattlesnake from Utah. Bull. Univ. Utah 20 (1).

concolor
Reptiles of the United States
Fauna of the Western United States